The 1986–87 Georgia Tech Yellow Jackets men's basketball team represented Georgia Institute of Technology during the 1986–87 NCAA Division I men's basketball season.

Roster

Schedule and results

|-
!colspan=9 style=| Regular Season

|-
!colspan=9 style=| ACC Tournament

|-
!colspan=9 style=| NCAA Tournament

Rankings

References

Georgia Tech Yellow Jackets men's basketball seasons
Georgia Tech
Georgia Tech